Vito Andrés Bártoli (25 May 1929 – 24 January 2019) was an Argentine footballer and manager.

He was the only coach to have won all three major championships in Peru.

Biography

Playing career
Bártoli established himself in Colombia with the club Unión Magdalena, where he was nicknamed "Sabino."  He was bought by Atlético Chalaco in 1955 and won two championships in Peruvian football leagues. He played for various teams in the late 1950s and early to mid-1960s. He spent his final season with the Peruvian Club Carlos Concha in 1966, who would be relegated at the end of the season.

Coaching career
Bártoli spent all of his coaching career in Peru, with the exception of a 2-year stint with the Colombian club Deportes Quindío. He led the club Juan Aurich to a second-place finish in the 1968 championships, turning around a team that had been subpar for so long. He won the Peruvian championship in 1970 with Sporting Cristal. He won the Copa Perú in 1984 with Los Espartanos. In 1989, the Bártoli-led Sport Boys won the 2nd Division Championship, Bártoli's third title overall. Throughout the 1990s Bártoli would lead Alianza Atlético. He spent his final season as a coach in 2002 with Juan Aurich.

Death
Nearly 17 years after retirement, Vito Andrés Bártoli died on 24 January 2019 at the age of 89.

References

Argentine footballers
1929 births
2019 deaths
Association football midfielders
Unión Magdalena footballers
Footballers from Buenos Aires
Club Carlos Concha players
León de Huánuco managers